King An may refer to:

King An of Zhou (died 376 BC)
An of Samhan (died 157 BC?)

See also
An, King of Han (died 226 BC)